HMS Bicester was a  of the Royal Navy. She was sold to the Greek Navy in 2001 as Europa.

References

Hunt-class mine countermeasures vessels
1985 ships
Europa